was a junior college in Minoh, Osaka, Japan. It was founded in 1967, and closed in 2005.

References

Educational institutions established in 1967
Educational institutions disestablished in 2005
Japanese junior colleges
1967 establishments in Japan
2005 disestablishments in Japan